Cycas cantafolia is a species of cycad endemic to peninsular Malaysia. It is only found in a chain of low-elevation hills west of the southern tip of the Gunung Ledang massif (Mount Ophir) in Johor.

References

cantafolia
Plants described in 2010